Nina Marie Tandon is an American biomedical engineer. She is the CEO and co-founder of EpiBone. She currently serves as an adjunct professor of Electrical Engineering at Cooper Union and is a senior fellow at the Lab for Stem Cells and Tissue Engineering at Columbia. She was a 2011 TED Fellow and a 2012 senior TED Fellow.

Personal life 
Nina Tandon grew up on Roosevelt Island in New York City.[10] She had one brother and two sisters.[11] As a child, Tandon discovered an interest in science when she discovered her siblings suffered from eye conditions. She and her siblings were each encouraged to try various science experiments; Tandon's siblings also pursued careers in scientific fields.[12] As a child, she enjoyed "taking apart TVs and building these giant Tinkertoy towers, playing with static electricity, and experimenting on [her] class for science fairs."[10] She participated in puzzles and problem-solving, community theatre, poetry, and sewing.[13]

In addition to English, Nina Tandon has studied French and Hindi and is able to speak Italian.[24] She has participated in marathons.[20][10] In 2010, she co-taught a science camp in Lynn, Massachusetts for underprivileged children.[25]She also enjoys metal-smithing and being a yoga instructor.

Education 
Nina Tandon attended college at Cooper Union, graduating with a Bachelor of Electrical Engineering in 2001.[4] While completing her undergraduate education, she built an electronic musical instrument which is played through human bodies' electromagnetic waves.[1] From 2003 to 2004, Tandon attended University of Rome Tor Vergata, having received a Fulbright scholarship.[4] There, she worked on the development of LibraNose, analyzing "patient breath samples to determine the feasibility of a noninvasive cancer-smelling device."[11] In 2006, she graduated from MIT with a MS in Electrical Engineering,[4] having received a MIT Presidential Fellowship in 2004.[11] In 2006, she started graduate work at the Boston School, she quickly changed to follow her mentor, Professor Gordana Vunjak- Novakovice. She then studied at Columbia University, graduating in 2009 with a PhD in Biomedical Engineering, with a concentration in Cardiac Tissue Engineering.[4][10] Tandon stated that her career path was inspired by relatives and was a process. At Columbia, she began creating human tissues.[14] She also received an MBA from Columbia in 2012.[15] She said that she wanted to bridge the gap between the possibilities of her research, and actually making them happen, and this is made possible with a business degree.

Career 
As a biomedical engineer, Tandon worked at Columbia University to force growth and stimulation of cells, using electrical currents. Currently, she has grown cells on rat hearts, to beat, but her ultimate goal is to have the ability to create a process where scientists can grow entire human organs.

She later co-founded EpiBone, and currently serves as the company's CEO.

Aside from her scientific research, Tandon has many other hobbies and interests such as metalworking, running marathons, and yoga. She started her career when she was hired by a telecommunications company, where she ended up doing customer service. Tandon worked at Avaya Labs, developing communications software[5][16] before specializing in biomedical engineering. Her medical career was inspired by her siblings; her brother has an eye disease and struggles to see clearly, and both of her sisters have issues with seeing colors, thus changing our perceptions of the outside world. Her career was also inspired by her mother, who encouraged science from a very young age.

Tandon is also a TED Senior fellow, speaking there several times. She is an adjunct professor of electrical engineering at Cooper Union and previously, she worked as an associate postdoctoral researcher for Stem Cells and Tissue Engineering Laboratory at Columbia University, where she attended school as well.

Honors and awards 
In 2011, she was named a TED Fellow.[19] The following year, she was named a senior TED Fellow[13] and one of Fast Company's Most Creative People of 2012.[20][21] Tandon was a recipient of Marie Claire'''s Women on Top Awards in 2013.[18] She was also named a Wired innovation fellow[22] and a 2015 Global Thinker by Foreign Policy''.[5] L'Oréal Paris named her as one of its Women of Worth in the science and innovation category[18] and Crains New York named her as part of its 40 Under 40 Class of 2015.[23] She also has three patents.

References

External links 
 Tandon's speech at 2015 Bloomberg Technology Conference

Year of birth missing (living people)
Engineers from New York City
American women engineers
American biomedical engineers
Columbia Business School alumni
Cooper Union alumni
Cooper Union faculty
Electrical engineering academics
Living people
MIT School of Engineering alumni
People from Roosevelt Island
University of Rome Tor Vergata alumni
Columbia School of Engineering and Applied Science alumni
American people of Indian descent
American women chief executives
American women of Indian descent in health professions
Fulbright alumni